Agnieszka Warchulska (born 15 May 1972, Ostrowiec Świętokrzyski, Poland) is a Polish actress.

Filmography 
1996: Cwał
1997: Wojenna narzeczona
1997: Linia opóźniająca
1997: Sława i chwała
1998: Pierwszy milion
1998: The Debt
1999–2001: Miasteczko
2002: Zaginiona
2003: Tak czy nie
2003: Sfora
2004: Wieża
2004–2005, 2007–2008: M jak miłość
2005: Teraz ja
2006–2007: Pogoda na piątek
2007: Dlaczego nie!

External links 
 
Agnieszka Warchulska at filmpolski.pl

Polish actresses
1972 births
Living people
Polish stage actresses
Aleksander Zelwerowicz National Academy of Dramatic Art in Warsaw alumni